The United Soccer League of Pennsylvania is an amateur soccer league that operates in Eastern Pennsylvania, primarily in the greater Philadelphia area. The USL of PA is the premier amateur soccer league in the Philadelphia region and southeastern Pennsylvania.

Overview 
The league currently has 30 teams, spanning four divisions: The Major Division, The Major II Division, the Over 30 Division, and the Women's Major division. The Major II Division is composed mainly of reserve squads of the Major Division Teams.

History 
The United Soccer League of PA, originated from "United Soccer", an organization founded in the mid-1950s to sponsor international soccer games in our area. Eventually a few men  from the organization came up with the idea to form a "German League". These men had pledged support from the Philadelphia United German-Hungarians, Phoenix SC, and the Vereinigung Erzgebirge. After a few weeks these men had their first open meeting and the preliminary work was done to form the league. A call went out to several other organizations such as Norristown, Allentown, Easton, Bethlehem, Camden, and Reading. In 1959, the idea of a "German League" was dropped and the UNITED SOCCER LEAGUE OF PENNSYLVANIA was founded.

Founders 

Frank Follmer - United German Hungarians
John Piatka - United German Hungarians
Carl Schmollinger - Phoenix SC
Werner Kraheck - Reading Americans
John Benkert - Schwarzwald Kickers
John Weber - United German Hungarians
Gustav Ingold - Vereinigung Erzgebirge
Werner Fricker - United German Hungarians
Carl Locher - Phoenix SC
Hans Kompauer - Schwarzwald Kickers
Erwin Green - Kolping SC
Stephen Augenbaugh - Phoenix SC
Alfred Hahn - Vereinigung Erzgebirge
Karl Zaute - Vereinigung Erzgebirge
William Robatzek - Phoenix SC
Herman Trautz - Vereinigung Erzgebirge
George Heinzelmann, Jr. - Vereingung Erzgebirge

Seasons 
Over 200 organizations have played soccer in the USLofPA in several divisions.

1959-1960 season

1962-1963 season 

Current Men's Major Clubs 
 Danubia Soccer Club
 Ukrainian Nationals
 Phoenix Sport Club
 Lancaster City FC
 United German Hungarians 
 Colonial SC
 Lighthouse United 
 West Chester United
 Deep Run Valley SA
 West-Mont United 
Vereinigung Erzgebirge

References

External links 
 United Soccer League of Pennsylvania // Facebook
 United Soccer League of Pennsylvania // United States Adult Soccer Association
 United Soccer League (Archive) // The Philly Soccer Page

Soccer leagues in the United States
Soccer in Pennsylvania